The Painter may refer to:

Film and theatre
The Painter (film), a 1982 Swedish film
The Painter (play), a 2011 play by Rebecca Lenkiewicz

Music

Albums
The Painter (KC and the Sunshine Band album), a 1981 album by KC and the Sunshine Band 
The Painter (Paul Anka album), a 1977 album by Paul Anka
The Painters, a 2017 EP by Animal Collective

Songs
"The Painter", a song by Deep Purple from the 1969 album Deep Purple (album)
"The Painter", a song by Chris de Burgh from the 1975 album Spanish Train and Other Stories
"The Painter", a song by Paul Anka from the 1976 album The Painter
"The Painter", a song by O-Town from the 2001 album O-Town (album)
"The Painter", a song by Neil Young from the 2005 album Prairie Wind (album)
"The Painter", a song by I'm from Barcelona from the 2006 EP Don't Give Up on Your Dreams, Buddy!
"The Painter", a song by Scottish musician Momus from the 2015 album Turpsycore
"The Painter", a song by Future Islands from the 2020 album As Long as You Are

People known as "The Painter"
 John the Painter (James Aitken; 1752–1777), British criminal
 Lazarus the Painter (810–865), Byzantine Christian saint
 Mohammad Yusef the Painter (fl. 1640–1648), Iranian illuminator
 Peter the Painter (fl. 1911), Latvian gangster

Other uses
 Painter (comics), a Marvel comics supervillian
The Painter, the main character of "The Number Painter" skits on the television show Sesame Street

See also
 
 Paint (disambiguation)